The anime series Kill la Kill, produced by Trigger, features a cast of characters with a variety of designs and abilities.  is a fictional high school situated in Tokyo Bay, Japan. The characters consist mainly of students who wear , which give their wearers superhuman abilities. The protagonist Ryuko Matoi is a transfer student who searches for her father's killer, teaming up with one of her new classmates, Mako Mankanshoku, as they fight against the iron-fisted student council president, Satsuki Kiryuin, and her mother, Ragyo Kiryuin's fashion empire.

Main characters

Ryuko Matoi

 is a 17-year-old schoolgirl, and the protagonist of the series, who transfers to Honnouji Academy in order to find the one who murdered her father Isshin Matoi. She possesses the Scissor Blade, one half of the  that Isshin created to destroy uniforms empowered by Life Fibers. At the start of the series, she acquires a special "kamui" uniform named , which grants her special abilities. She lives with the Mankanshoku family. Right after arriving at Honnouji Academy, Ryuko vows to fight her way up Honnouji Academy and eventually reach Satsuki Kiryuin, as she speculates she knows of the person who killed her father.  Despite having a strong and at times fiery temper, she rapidly forms a friendship with Honnouji student Mako Mankanshoku, who supports her emotionally, and is present with her to assist and calm her down when necessary.  She is initially used by Satsuki and the Final Four, as her combats with them and fellow students help Satsuki improve and perfect the Goku Uniforms. Ryuko is later revealed to be Satsuki's presumed dead younger sister during the battle at the Honnouji Academy Cultural & Sports Grand Festival, revealed to have become a human infused with Life Fibers as the result of her being experimented on as a newborn baby by their mother Ragyo. She was saved by her father, Soichiro Kiryuin, who assumed the identity of Isshin, in order to raise her protected from Ragyo's reach. Upon learning of Satsuki's true intentions to overthrow their mother and save humanity, Ryuko allies with her and the Final Four, ultimately managing to save the world from the Life Fiber threat. With the world free to wear normal clothing again, Ryuko stars a new chapter in her life alongside Mako, Satsuki and her newfound friends in the Elite Four and Nudist Beach.

Satsuki Kiryuin

 is an 18-year-old student council president of Honnouji Academy whose signature weapon is the Life Fiber severing katana , administering Goku Uniforms to students using various hierarchical schemes such as a no-late day event and battle royale-esque tournaments such as the Naturals Election. When Ryuko arrives to Honnouji Academy, Satsuki decides to don the Kiryuin Family's kamui  and manages to take command of it through force of will. But unlike Ryuko who established a symbiosis with Senketsu, Satsuki is unable to use Junketsu's full power and can only use it effectively for short periods of time.
Though Satsuki serves as a major opponent to Ryuko for most of the series, Satsuki utilizes Honnouji Academy as a means to eliminate her mother and the Life Fiber threat. Satsuki makes her move to assassinate Ragyo during the Honnouji Academy Cultural & Sports Grand Festival to celebrate the schools’ subjugating, but is captured while learning Ryuko is her presumed dead younger sister. After being freed by Nudist Beach with Junketsu modified to be more compliant, Satsuki makes amends with Ryuko before they team up to face Ragyo in the series finale. In the OVA epilogue, Satsuki closed down Honnouji Academy as it had fulfilled its purpose while giving Rei closure.
In the events of Kill la Kill the Game: IF video game, Satsuki is placed in a dream-based reality while first donning Junketsu with the events of the series storyline played out. While facing the Primordial Life Fiber, Satsuki briefly powers up into  before being consumed by her delusion. But Ryuko saved Satuski while loaning her the Rending Scissors to destroy the illusory world so she can awaken with no memory of the events.

Mako Mankanshoku

 is an energetic second-year student who is Ryuko's classmate and best friend. She immediately befriends Ryuko upon the latter's arrival at the school. Mako lives with her parents and younger brother in the slums of Honnō City. She is described as an "uber air-head" whose "unbelievable actions never cease to shock and awe the people around her." Despite putting herself in dangerous situations, she has a good heart and cares deeply for Ryuko, providing her with constant encouragement. Senketsu notes that Mako is vital for getting Ryuko to relax. In the episode where she runs the Fight Club, she receives a two-star Goku Uniform styled like that of a delinquent. She later gets a second copy of it to wear to help defend the Naked Sol with the Elite Four and other club presidents during the final assault against Ragyo. Her humanity and kindness are often put to the test, like when she is pressured to fight Ryuko to keep her newfound social status, but resisted after seeing her injured , and in the instances where she manages to appeal to her friendship with her, calming her down or defending her from danger.

Senketsu

 is a talking sailor uniform that Ryuko finds beneath her house. Initially, it absorbs a large amount of her blood and only allows her to act for a limited time, however, it is soon able to fully synchronize with Ryuko as she gets over her embarrassment of wearing such a skimpy outfit. Whenever Ryuko destroys a Goku Uniform, Senketsu absorbs its Life Fiber. Mikisugi later reveals that Issei Matoi designed Senketsu from Ryuko's DNA to enable her to fight against the propagators of the Life Fibers. It was only after the revelation of Ryuko's hybrid nature that Senketsu is revealed to be partially human. Though Ryuko defeats Ragyo, Senketsu starts dissolving from having absorbed both their allies' Life Fiber clothing and Ragyo's as he uses his final moments to safely get Ryuko back to Earth.

Supporting characters

Honnouji Academy Elite Four
The  are the leaders in Satsuki's student council. They wear Three-Star Goku Uniforms.

Uzu Sanageyama

 is a former gang member who joins Satsuki after she single-handedly defeated his gang. He regulates the athletic clubs at Honnouji Academy, including the Boxing Club and the Tennis Club. Sanageyama. himself specializes in kendo and possesses the three-star Goku Uniform, which takes the form of a large armored bōgu. He initially possesses , which allows to him to predict his opponent's moves with super fast eyesight. However, after suffering a defeat from Ryuko, he chooses to have his eyes sewn shut, heightening his other senses and giving him a more powerful , which allows him to perceive things with no blind spots. During the final battle with Ragyo, he unseals his eyes, not wanting to hold back against her.

Houka Inumuta

 is a hacker who got caught hacking into the REVOCS Corporation by its security staff and was offered a part in Satsuki's group. He is in charge of Honnouji Academy's information and strategy committee, aiding the student council by analyzing the performance of Goku Uniforms and kamui in battle, and helping the Sewing Club with upgraded uniforms. His three-star Goku Uniform, allows him to quickly calculate attack trajectories and use optical camouflage to hide from his opponents.

Ira Gamagoori

 is a towering, muscular man who is Satsuki's loyal enforcer who leads the disciplinary committee at Honnouji Academy. By enduring such masochistic attacks, he can activate its second transformation, which covers his body in thorny whips. During his teenage years, Ira tried to save a student from a force suicide by two influential students until he was aided by Satsuki who defeated the students. He is 20 years old, having waited two years after graduating Rinne-Dō Junior High before enrolling at Honnouji to assist Satsuki with her plans. He drives a pink 1959 Cadillac Eldorado.

Nonon Jakuzure

 regulates the school's non-athletic clubs, such as Gardening Club and Biology Club. Among the members of the Elite Four, she has been with Satsuki since kindergarten and thus claims that she knows her best. She possesses the three-star Goku Uniform , which transforms into a giant sound system that produces powerful soundwaves and can transform into a flying airship. Later, she receives an upgraded version, Symphony Regalia MK.II, that miniaturizes the airship in a jetpack.

Mankanshoku family
The  is Mako's family that resides within Honnō City's slums. They take Ryuko in after the latter transfers to Honnouji Academy.

Barazo Mankanshoku

 is Mako's father. He is a doctor that runs a back-alley clinic in Hannō City's slums. Barazo admits that he may have killed more patients than he has saved.

Sukuyo Mankanshoku

 is Mako's mother. She is a carefree housewife who is kind to Ryuko, and makes croquettes with mystery meats.

Mataro Mankanshoku

 is Mako's younger brother. He is a delinquent who initially tries to rob Ryuko when he first encounters her.

Guts

 is the Mankanshoku family pug. He is dressed in a light bluish-grey hooded sweater. In episode 2, Mataro says that they named him Guts "because he eats with a lot of gusto".

Nudist Beach

Aikuro Mikisugi

 is Ryuko's enigmatic homeroom teacher. He secretly observes and aids Ryuko by leading her to Senketsu. Whilst generally having the appearance of a frail, shaggy teacher, he is actually a glamorous smooth-talker with a habit of slowly stripping his clothes and making moves on Ryuko whenever they are in private, much to Ryuko's embarrassment. Aikuro reveals to Ryuko the existence of Nudist Beach and his being one of its members (though she did not believe him due to the organization's ridiculous name). Whenever he strips, pink light radiates from his nipples and from his crotch, obscuring them. Mikisugi's character design is based on people such as TM Network's vocalist Takashi Utsunomiya and Kenji Sawada, people who appear smart and good-looking.

Tsumugu Kinagase

 is a scientist at the Nudist Beach organization and an acquaintance of Aikuro who sports a red mohawk on top of short black hair. He bears a strong hatred of kamui, which stems from an experiment where his close sister, died when the kamui she had volunteered to test ran her blood dry. His weapon is a sewing machine pistol that fires needles which severs the connections between the Life Fibers in kamui and Goku Uniforms and their wearers. The needles also act like acupuncture, in that it can immobilize opponents and invigorate them afterward.

Isshin Matoi

 is Ryuko's deceased father, and the creator of Senketsu and the Scissor Blades. He was murdered by Nui, who stole the purple blade, whilst he left the red blade to Ryuko. He is also the founder of Nudist Beach, an organization created to oppose Revocs. He is actually , Satsuki's father and Ragyo's husband, who faked his death and took on the identity of Isshin Matoi to raise Ryuko.

REVOCS Corporation

Ragyo Kiryuin

 is Ryuko and Satsuki's mother and the main antagonist of the series, being both Director of Honnouji Academy and the CEO of the Revocs Corporation which manufactures and supplies a preponderance of the world's clothing with her product laced with Life Fibers. One of her abilities is Mind Stitch where she imbued Life Fibers into peoples' heads to control like puppets. She eventually dons the wedding dress-like ultimate kamui, gaining the  ability which allows her to manipulate anything made of Life Fibers except Senketsu. While Shinra-Kotetsu was originally powered by Rei Honoumaru, Ragyo had it absorb Harime and the Primordial Life Fiber commence her end game. After Ryuko reverses the Life Fiber takeover after Senketsu assimilated Shinra-Kotetsu, Ragyo chooses to crush her heart rather than accept defeat on anyone's terms but her own, warning Ryuko that the other Life Fibers in the universe will eventually come to Earth and finish what she started.

Nui Harime

 is the Grand Couturier (High Order Tailor) of the Kiryuin family, initially appearing as a petite twin tailed girl with a parasol and wearing an eyepatch. She has sociopathic tendencies, smiling and acting cheerful even when revealing to Ryuko that she killed her father and stole half of his Rending Scissors, at the cost of her eye. She later reveals that she is actually a human/Life Fiber hybrid that was incubated within the Primordial Life Fiber, with superhuman abilities such as tearing apart Life Fibers in Goku Uniforms and kamuis, manipulating people's minds with Mental Stitching, healing from severe cuts to her body, cloning herself, and changing her appearance. The only time in the series where she loses her cool is when Ryuko severs her arms at the Life Fiber level. She helps create Ragyo's kamui Shinra-Kotetsu and sacrifices herself at Ragyo's request to help the latter attain her ultimate power.

Rei Hououmaru

 is a Revocs corporate officer and Ragyo's personal secretary. Rei originally lived in a wartorn African village whose inhabitants were said to have a unique resistance to Life Fibers, saved and adopted by Ragyo. Believing humanity deserved to be consumed by the Life Fibers, Rei willfully offered herself as a sacrifice to activate Shinra-Kotetsu before being forcefully removed from it. Following Ragyo's death, Rei attempted to exact revenge by using Life Fiber-based clones of Satsuki and her Elite Four to disrupt Honnouji Academy's graduation ceremony. Though it failed thanks to the efforts of the Elite Four and Ryuko, Satsuki is able to convince Rei to let go of her vendetta and instead help her make the world a better place. Rei joins Satsuki as they flee the sinking island that the academy and city stood on, giving it one final salute with the Elite Four, Iori, Mitsuzo, and the students as it goes to the bottom of Tokyo Bay.

Other characters

Takiji Kuroido

 is the head steward to the Kiryuin family. He reports directly to Ragyo and takes care of the Kiryuin Mansion.

Mitsuzo Soroi

 is Satsuki's personal and trusted butler, having served her since her early childhood. He is also Shiro Iori's uncle. Soroi often serves tea to Satsuki, but he also serves tea to the Elite Four, and later the Nudist Beach members when they go to rescue Satsuki. He wears a three-piece suit.

Kaneo Takarada

 is a money-crazed student council president of Naniwa Kinman High School in the Osaka region, his family's wealth rivals that of the Kiruyins as he secretly funded Nudist Beach. Takarada uses his Takarada-printed money to have locals fight Kiryuin's forces for him when they arrives to both conquer his school and destroy the Nudist Beach base located in the city. After Ragyo and the Covers take over Japan, Takarada spends his remaining fortune to complete Nudist Beach's battleship Naked Sol. He is last seen seeing them off with a respectful salute, wishing them good luck against Ragyo.

Honnouji Academy club leaders

Shiro Iori

 is the president of Honnouji Academy's Sewing Club and a member of Satsuki's inner circle as the nephew of Satuski's butler Misuzo. His role in Satsuki's group is to analyze the combat ability of the Goku uniforms he creates and make necessary improvements. While not a combatant, his three-star Goku Uniform  allows him to create numerous Goku Uniforms within minutes.

Other club leaders
Several of the school's club leaders challenge Ryuko in early episodes of the series. They include:

  is in charge of the Boxing Club and Ryuko's first opponent, reporting to Uzu Sanageyama. His gloves become iron through his two-star Goku Uniform.
  is the captain of the Tennis Club with a type of lens over her right eye. She has a two-star Goku Uniform where the bottom of her skirt is full of tennis balls.

 is part of the Discipline Committee. She wears glasses and pretends to be a struggling student that helps Ryuko and Mako to clear the obstacles for No Late Day. In reality, she is the one in charge of setting the obstacles and traps for the disciplinary committee. Maiko gets busted by Ira for conspiring against Satsuki and is expelled.
  is the general manager of the Gardening Club Terrace. He confronts Kinagase on the rooftop. Kusanosuke wears a blue hat cloth with yellow polka dots and wears a two-star Goku Uniform. His plant weapons resemble carnivorous plants. 
  is the general manager of the Gardening Club Backyard Garden. He tries to avenge Kusanosuke's defeat. Kusatao wears a yellow hat cloth with pink polka dots and wears a two-star Goku Uniform. His plant weapons resemble vines.
  is the president of the Automotive Airsoft Club, which merged the Auto Club with the Airsoft Club. He has flaming red hair. They chase down Gamagoori during the battle royal week of the Naturals Election and are defeated by him.

Some additional club leaders make an appearance in episode 7 when Satsuki offers upgraded Goku Uniforms and perks for club presidents.
 , the president of the Knife Throwing Club.
 , the president of the Nanjing Lily Club.
 , the president of the Tightrope Walking Club.
 , the president of the Folk Dance Club.
 , the president of the Pottery, Arts, and Crafts Clubs.
 , the president of the Ping Pong Club.
 , the president of the Origami Club.

Kami-Kobe High School
With Kobe being a port city, the school building is modeled after a sailing ship. Among its known students are:

  is the alliance representative of the Kami-Kobe High School Armed Faction in the Kansai region..
  is the deputy armed faction alliance representative of the Kami-Kobe High School Armed Faction in the Kansai region.

Abekamo Academy
The student council leaders of Abekamo Academy consist of four guardians, named after the Four Symbols:

 , Guardian Student of the North, dressed as the Black Tortoise.
  (Guardian Student of the South, dressed as the Vermilion Bird.
 , Guardian Student of the East, dressed as the Blue Dragon.
 , Guardian Student of the West, dressed as the White Tiger.

Reception
Kill la Kill won multiple prizes during the 4th Newtype Anime Awards, including Best Character Design. In the Best Mascot category, Senketsu placed third and Guts placed ninth. In Best Female Character, Ryuko placed second, and Mako placed third. Aya Suzaki, who voiced Mako, placed fourth in Voice Actor Award (female), while Ami Koshimizu, who voiced Ryuko, placed seventh.

Notes

References
Kill la Kill anime

 Episode 1:  
 Episode 2:  
 Episode 3:  
 Episode 4:  
 Episode 5:  
 Episode 6:  
 Episode 7:  
 Episode 8:  
 Episode 9:  
 Episode 10:  
 Episode 11:  
 Episode 12:  
 Episode 13:  
 Episode 14:  
 Episode 15:  
 Episode 16:  
 Episode 17:  
 Episode 18:  
 Episode 19:  
 Episode 20:  
 Episode 21:  
 Episode 22:  
 Episode 23:  
 Episode 24:  
 OVA:  

Other references

External links

 

Lists of anime and manga characters